Wichmann or Wichman may refer to:

Wichmann (crater), a lunar impact crater
Wichmann the Elder (d. 944), medieval German nobleman
Wichmann the Younger (d. 967), son of the Elder, medieval German nobleman
Wichmann von Seeburg (1115–1192), Archbishop of Magdeburg, in modern Germany
Wichmann Diesel (1903–1986) Norwegian marine engine manufacturer (now part of Wärtsilä)
Wichmann (surname)
Vaine Wichman, Cook Islands politician and development economist